The Scottish Schools Curling Championship is an annual curling competition held to determine the best school curling team in Scotland.  

The current champions are Kelso High School, who defeated a team from St. Joseph's College in the final on 10 March 2019.

Previous winners
A list of previous School Champions:

References

See also
Scottish Men's Curling Championship 
Scottish Women's Curling Championship
Scottish Mixed Curling Championship
Scottish Mixed Doubles Curling Championship
Scottish Junior Curling Championships
Scottish Senior Curling Championships
Scottish Wheelchair Curling Championship

Curling competitions in Scotland
Youth sport in Scotland
1967 establishments in Scotland
Recurring sporting events established in 1967
National curling championships